Lin Wensheng (born 6 June 1970) is a Chinese weightlifter. He competed in the men's middleweight event at the 1992 Summer Olympics.

References

1970 births
Living people
Chinese male weightlifters
Olympic weightlifters of China
Weightlifters at the 1992 Summer Olympics
Place of birth missing (living people)
20th-century Chinese people